Smith Building may refer to:

H. D. Smith Company Building, Plantsville, Connecticut, listed on the National Register of Historic Places in Hartford County, Connecticut
H. W. Smith Building, Punta Gorda, Florida, listed on the NRHP in Florida
D. G. Smith Building, Abilene, Kansas, listed on the NRHP in Kansas
Mitchell Baker Smith Company Building, Lexington, Kentucky, listed on the NRHP in Kentucky
Bradford Smith Building, New Bedford, Massachusetts, listed on the NRHP in Massachusetts
W. J. and Ed Smith Building, West Plains, Missouri, listed on the NRHP in Missouri
E. L. Smith Building, Hood River, Oregon, listed on the NRHP in Oregon
R. S. Smith Motor Company Building, Sandy, Oregon, listed on the NRHP in Oregon
Ashbel Smith Building, Galveston, Texas, listed on the NRHP in Texas
Smith Tower, Seattle, Washington
Smith Building (Parkersburg, West Virginia), listed on the NRHP in West Virginia
W.H. Smith Hardware Company Building, Parkersburg, West Virginia, listed on the NRHP in West Virginia

See also
Smith House (disambiguation)